The Irish College was a seminary at Douai, France, for Irish Roman Catholics in exile on the continent of Europe to study for the priesthood, modelled on the English College there. Dedicated to St. Patrick, the college was sometimes referred to as St. Patrick's College, Douai.

History
It was founded in 1603 by Fr. Christopher Cusack (a member of a prominent landowning family from  County  Meath), with the support of Philip III of Spain, as a Spanish foundation and endowed with 5,000 florins a year by the King of Spain. Fr. Cusack had some years earlier tried to set up a hostel to support Irish candidates for the priesthood in Douai.

The course of studies lasted six years and the students attended lectures at the university of Douai, where its Faculty of Theology took the Irish Seminary of Douai under its wing in 1610. In 1667 Louis XIV of France, took control of Douai and the Irish college there became subject to French authority.

The college benefited from the expertise of English scholars in Douai, priests were trained to preach in the Irish language.

The college was rebuilt about the middle of the 18th century. The college closed in 1793 and in 1795 the buildings, valued at 60,000 francs, were alienated by the French Government during the war against the United Kingdom in 1793 to 1802, and provided back to Irish priests in 1802.

People associated with the Irish College, Douai
Blessed Patrick O'Loughran attended the Irish College before returning to Ireland in 1611. Fr. Cusack served as head of the college, until his death in 1619, he was succeeded by his cousin, Laurence Sedgrave who had been vice-president, and served until 1633. Luke Bellew from Galway, studied at the college, and became its president. Bishop Edward Dillon served as Superior of the College prior to returning to Ireland and becoming a Bishop. Patrick O’Nachten who turned down the bishopric of Killala, also served as President of the college. Fr Luke McKiernan served as president/rector of the Irish College in Douai (1752-84).

Alumni
 Bishop Nicholas Joseph Archdeacon, Bishop of Kilmacduagh and Kilfenora
 Fr. Luke Bellew, served as President of the College
 Bishop Edward Dillon, Archbishop of Tuam, and earlier Bishop of Kilmacduagh and Kilfenora
 Dr. Patrick Fleming OFM, Professor of Theology, Leuven, and first rector of the Franciscan Irish College, Prague: he was Christopher Cusack's nephew.
 Bishop Heber MacMahon, Bishop of Clogher
 Bishop Daniel O'Reilly, Bishop of Clogher, also served as President of the Irish College, Antwerp (1732-1747).
 Bishop Edmund O'Reilly, Archbishop of Armagh, began his studies in Douai
 Bishop David Rothe, Bishop of Ossory, completed his studies in Salamanca
 Bishop Patrick Plunkett O.Cist, Bishop of Ardagh and Bishop of Meath (tutored his cousin's son St. Oliver Plunkett)

See also 

 University of Douai
 English College, Douai
 Scottish College, Douai 
 Irish College
 List of Jesuit sites

References

Counter-Reformation
Defunct universities and colleges in France
Educational institutions established in the 1600s
Catholic seminaries
Irish College
Irish diaspora in Europe
Irish Colleges on the Continent